Warren Blatt (born 1962) is an American genealogist and computer engineer who is the Managing Director of JewishGen, an online source for researching Jewish roots. He is the author/coauthor of a number of books including Getting Started in Jewish Genealogy (with Gary Mokotoff).

Blatt received the Lifetime Achievement Award of the International Association of Jewish Genealogical Societies in 2004.

Works and publications

References

Living people
1962 births
American genealogists
Jewish genealogy
Jewish American historians
American male non-fiction writers
21st-century American historians
21st-century American male writers
21st-century American Jews